The Constitution of Pennsylvania is the supreme law within the Commonwealth of Pennsylvania. All acts of the General Assembly, the governor, and each governmental agency are subordinate to it. Since 1776, Pennsylvania's Constitution has undergone five versions. The current Constitution entered into force in 1968, and has been amended numerous times.

The Constitution may only be amended if a proposed modification receives a majority vote of two consecutive sessions of the General Assembly and then is approved by the electorate. Emergency amendments are permitted by a vote of two-thirds of the General Assembly and an affirmative vote by the electorate within one month. In such emergency situations, commonwealth election officials are required to publish notice of the referendum on a proposed amendment in a minimum of two newspapers in every county. In an event that more than one emergency amendment is proposed, each additional amendment is to be voted on separately.

The Constitution (1968, as amended)
The current Constitution of Pennsylvania comprises the following concise Preamble, and Articles and Schedules:

Preamble

Articles and Schedules
 Article I. Declaration of Rights
 Article II. The Legislature
 Article III. Legislation
 Article IV. The Executive
 Article V. The Judiciary
 Article VI. Public Officers
 Article VII. Elections
 Article VIII. Taxation and Finance
 Article IX. Local Government
 Article X. Private Corporations
 Article XI. Amendments
 Schedule No. 1 (Adopted with the Constitution)
 Schedule No. 2 (Amendments of November 2, 1909)

History
Pennsylvania has had five constitutions during its statehood: 1776, 1790, 1838, 1874, and 1968. Prior to that, the colonial Province of Pennsylvania was governed for a century by a book titled Frame of Government, written by William Penn, of which there were four versions: 1682, 1683, 1696, and 1701.

See also
Pennsylvania Constitution of 1776
Law of Pennsylvania

References

External links
The Constitution of the Commonwealth of Pennsylvania
Pennsylvania's Constitutions and the Amendment Process - Where it Began, Where it is Now
Pennsylvania Constitution Web Page
Text of 1776 Constitution

Pennsylvania Constitution - Current